Cornel Penu (born 16 June 1946) is a retired Romanian handball goalkeeper. He earned 257 caps with the national team and won the world title in 1970 and 1974 and two Olympic medals in 1972 and 1976. He was named Best Goalkeeper at the 1974 World Championships, and was selected for the World Team three times: in 1973, 1975 and 1976.

Penu took up handball in his hometown in 1958, and after enrolling to the University of Galați he played for Știința Galați. He graduated in 1968 from the Machine Construction Technology Department. The same year he moved to Dinamo Bucharest, where he stayed until his retirement in 1980. After that he coached goalkeepers for Dinamo Bucharest and for the Romanian national team. He left Romania in 1993 to work as a coach in Morocco, and as of 2012 he was living in France.

One of Penu's hobbies is painting.

Distinctions
Honored Master of Sport, 1970
Honored Citizen of Buzău, 2011

Bibliography
Hristache Naum, Ultimul apărător, 1983, Ed. Sport-Turism, Bucharest, 207 p.

References

External links 
 
 
 

1946 births
Living people
Romanian male handball players
CS Dinamo București (men's handball) players
Handball players at the 1972 Summer Olympics
Handball players at the 1976 Summer Olympics
Olympic handball players of Romania
Olympic silver medalists for Romania
Olympic bronze medalists for Romania
Olympic medalists in handball
People from Buzău
Medalists at the 1976 Summer Olympics
Medalists at the 1972 Summer Olympics